Shore Leave is a 1925 American silent comedy film directed by John S. Robertson and starring Richard Barthelmess and Dorothy Mackaill. It was produced by Barthelmess's production company, Inspiration, and released by First National Pictures.

Shore Leave is based on the stage play of the same name written by Hubert Osborne. The play ran on Broadway at the Lyceum Theatre from August 8 to December 1922 for a total of 151 performances. The play starred James Rennie and Frances Starr in the leads played by Barthelmess and Mackaill in the film.

Cast

Preservation
Shore Leave survives in the public domain and is available for download at archive.org.  It is also available with musical accompaniment from online streaming services.

A print of Shore Leave is in a private collection.

References

External links

1925 films
1925 comedy films
Silent American comedy films
American silent feature films
American black-and-white films
American films based on plays
Films directed by John S. Robertson
First National Pictures films
1920s American films
1920s English-language films